The Svalia is a 36-km long river in northern Lithuania and a right tributary of the Lėvuo river.

The town of Pasvalys is located near the mouth of the Svalia and is named after it. Pasvalys in Lithuanian language means "[town] near Svalia".

References

Rivers of Lithuania